San Antonio shooting may refer to:

 Sam Houston High School shooting, a 1990 school shooting at Sam Houston High School
 Shooting of Benjamin Marconi, a 2016 shooting of a detective with the San Antonio Police Department
 Rolling Oaks Mall shooting, a 2017 shooting at Rolling Oaks Mall

See also
List of shootings in Texas